"The Blue Mountains" is a poem written by Alfred Noyes, and set to music by the English composer Edward Elgar.  It was one of the songs (collectively known as the "Pageant of Empire") written to be performed in the Pageant of Empire at the British Empire Exhibition in Wembley Park, London, on 21 July 1924.

The song is subtitled "A Song of Australia". It refers to the Blue Mountains of New South Wales, Australia, and the pioneers who went westward to new lands beyond them.

References

Richards, Jeffrey "Imperialism and Music: Britain 1876-1953" (Manchester University Press, 2002)

External links 
 
Digital Collections The Blue Mountains

Songs by Edward Elgar
1924 songs
Culture of the Blue Mountains (New South Wales)
World's fair music
British Empire Exhibition